Sfaray,  is a  village in the Jezzine District of the South Governorate of Lebanon, about 53 km  south of Beirut.

History
In 1838, Eli Smith noted  Sufareih, as a village located in "Aklim et-Tuffah, adjacent to Seida".

References

Bibliography

External links
Sfaray, localiban

Populated places in Jezzine District